Mount Robinson is a mountain on West Falkland. It was known as "Monte Independencia" in Spanish until it was found Mount Adam was higher. It is the second highest point on the island. It is close to the source of the Warrah River.

References

Robinson